Zeta Piscium (ζ Piscium, abbreviated Zet Psc, ζ Psc) is a quintuple star system in the zodiac constellation of Pisces. Based upon parallax measurements obtained during the Hipparcos mission, it is located roughly  distant from the Sun.

The system consists of a binary star (Zeta Piscium A) and a triple star system (BC), the latter consisting of a spectroscopic binary (B) and a single star (C). A's two components are themselves designated Zeta Piscium Aa (officially named Revati ) and Ab; B's two components as Ba and Bb.

As the star system is 0.21° south of the ecliptic, it can be eclipsed (occulted) by the moon, when close to or at one of its two nodes of its orbit; and is eclipsed by the sun from about 8-10 April.

Nomenclature 

ζ Piscium (Latinised to Zeta Piscium) is the system's Bayer designation. The designations of the three constituents as Zeta Piscium A, B and C, and those of A's and B's components - Zeta Piscium Aa, Ab, Ba and Bb - derive from the convention used by the Washington Multiplicity Catalog (WMC) for multiple star systems, and adopted by the International Astronomical Union (IAU).

The system is identified with Revati (रेवती rēvatī), one of the Indian nakshatra (lunar mansions). In 2016, the IAU organized a Working Group on Star Names (WGSN) to catalog and standardize proper names for stars. The WGSN decided to attribute proper names to individual stars rather than entire multiple systems. It approved the name Revati for the constituent Zeta Piscium A on 30 June 2017 and it is now so included in the List of IAU-approved Star Names. Where a component letter is not explicitly listed, the WGSN says that the name should be understood to be attributed to the brightest component by visual brightness (component Aa in this case).

Properties 

The primary, Zeta Piscium A, is a pair of A-type subgiant stars with an angular separation of 0.15 arcseconds and visual magnitude 5.28.

The secondary, Zeta Piscium B, is a spectroscopic binary with a period of 9.075 days and an eccentricity of 0.04. Together, components Ba and Bb have a combined visual magnitude of 6.43 and lie at an angular separation of 22.9 arcseconds from the primary. They are a F-type main sequence star and a G-type main sequence star, respectively.

The tertiary and fifth component, Zeta Piscium C, is a magnitude 12.2 star at an angular separation 1.0 arc seconds from component B.

Together the star system has an apparent magnitude of +4.9.

See also
 Zeta Piscium in fiction

References

Pisces (constellation)
Piscium, Zeta
A-type subgiants
F-type main-sequence stars
G-type main-sequence stars
Durchmusterung objects
Piscium, 086
007344/45
005737/43
0361/0362
5